Solomon van Vechten van Rensselaer (August 9, 1774 – April 23, 1852) was a United States representative from the state of New York, a lieutenant colonel during the War of 1812, and postmaster of Albany for 17 years.

Early life
Solomon van Rensselaer was born on August 9, 1774 in Greenbush in the Province of New York, the son of Hendrick Kiliaen "Henry" Van Rensselaer (1744–1816) and Alida Bratt. He completed preparatory studies in East Greenbush.

Career
He appointed as a cornet in the United States Army in 1792, was promoted to captain in July 1793, and then to major in January 1799, before being honorably discharged in June 1800. He was Adjutant General of New York from 1801 to 1809, 1810 to 1811, and 1813 to 1821.  He served in the War of 1812 as a lieutenant colonel of New York State Militia.

He was elected as a Federalist to the Sixteenth and Seventeenth United States Congresses, and served from March 4, 1819 to January 14, 1822, when he resigned. He was postmaster of Albany, New York from 1822 to 1839, and from 1841 to 1843 and a delegate from New York at the opening of the Erie Canal on November 4, 1825. He owned slaves.

Personal life
In January 1797, he married his cousin, Harriet "Arriet" Van Rensselaer (1775–1840), the daughter of Philip Kiliaen van Rensselaer (1747–1798), the owner of the Cherry Hill mansion.  Of their many children, only five daughters and one son survived to maturity:
Adaline "Alida" Van Rensselaer (1797–1858)
Elizabeth Van Rensselaer (1799–1835), who married Richard Van Rensselaer (1797–1880)
Rensselaer Van Rensselaer (1802–1850), who married Mary Euphemia Forman in 1840.
Van Vechten Van Rensselaer (1806–1812), who died aged 6.
Rufus King Van Rensselaer (1809–1809), who died aged 3 months.
Margarita Van Rensselaer (1810–1880)
Stephen Van Rensselaer (1812–1813), who died aged 10 months.
Harriet Maria Van Rensselaer (1816–1896), who married Dr. Peter Elmendorf (1815–1881)
Catharine Visscher Van Rensselaer (1817–1891), who married Rev. Samuel W. Bonney (1815–1864) in 1856.
Van Rensselaer died near Albany, aged 77. He was interred in the North Dutch Church Cemetery, in Albany, and reinterred in Albany Rural Cemetery.  His home at Albany, Cherry Hill, was listed on the National Register of Historic Places in 1971. As his sons had all predeceased Solomon, his daughter, Harriet Maria Elmendorf inherited Cherry Hill.

References
Notes

Sources
 Retrieved on 2008-03-21

External links

1774 births
1852 deaths
People from Rensselaer County, New York
People of the Province of New York
Solomon
American people of Dutch descent
Federalist Party members of the United States House of Representatives from New York (state)
New York (state) postmasters
American slave owners
Adjutants General of New York (state)
United States Army officers
American militia officers
American militiamen in the War of 1812
Burials at Albany Rural Cemetery